Elisabeth "Lisa" Bennington (born January 20, 1976) was a Democratic member of the Pennsylvania House of Representatives for the 21st District. She was elected in 2006. She retired prior to the 2008 election.

References

External links
Bennington Law Firm, LLC legal practice website
Pennsylvania House of Representatives - Lisa Bennington official PA House website
Pennsylvania House Democratic Caucus - Representative Lisa Bennington official Party website
Biography, voting record, and interest group ratings at Project Vote Smart
Follow the Money - Lisa Bennington
2006 campaign contributions

Members of the Pennsylvania House of Representatives
1976 births
Living people
Chatham University alumni
Women state legislators in Pennsylvania
21st-century American women